The Military ranks of the Colombian armed forces consist of the list and ordering of the different military ranks, for the Officers, Non-commissioned officers (NCOs) and soldiers, seamen and airmen ("other ranks") of the Military Forces of Colombia.
The ranks are visually represented by insignias placed on the uniforms, usually at the shoulders, sleeves and shirt collars.

Note that a literal translation from Spanish to English may be misleading as the rank names don't necessarily follow the customary order used in anglophone military ranks in all cases. Furthermore, Colombia is not a member of NATO, so there is not an official equivalence between the Colombian military ranks and those defined by NATO. The displayed parallel is approximate and for illustration purposes only.

Applicable law
The ranks in the Military Forces of Colombia are regulated through the following applicable legislation: the Decree-Law 1790 of 2000, Law 1405 of 2010, and Law 1792 of 2016

In terms of protocol, the established order for the forces is Army, Navy, Air Force, Police, as established by the Military Rules of Protocol (Reglamento de Protocolo Militar FFMM)

Army 

The Colombian Army is the largest of the three service branches of the Military Forces of Colombia, tasked with defending sovereignty and law and order across the national territory. The tables below display the rank structures and rank insignias for the Colombian Army personnel.

Officers

Enlisted

Soldier types
 : Conscripted soldier serving for a period of 22 months mandatory service .
 : Regular soldiers that stay in the army after completing their 22 months' mandatory conscription service, making it a permanent career. The number in their rank insignia indicating the number of years they have served.

Additional ranks
 are soldiers who have gained recognition through their achievements and have special training. They have a certain degree of authority over regular soldiers.

Navy

The Colombian Navy is the maritime service branch of the Military Forces of Colombia, responsible for security and defense in both the Atlantic (Caribbean) and Pacific seas of Colombia, the extensive network of rivers inside the country, and a few small land areas under its direct jurisdiction. The tables below display the rank structures and rank insignias for the Colombian Navy personnel.

Officers

Enlisted

Marine Infantry 

In Colombia, the Marine Infantry is a Corps depending on the Colombian Navy and not a full service branch on its own. Being tasked with amphibious and riverine and littoral operations, the MI presents a combination of ranking names derived from the Army, combined with naval insignias. The tables below display the rank structures and rank insignias for the Colombian Marine Infantry personnel.

Officers

Enlisted

Air Force 

The Colombian Air Force is the service branch of the Military Forces of Colombia tasked with the protection  and defense of the Colombian sovereign airspace.
The tables below display the rank structures and rank insignias for the Colombian Air Force personnel.

Officers

Enlisted

Pre-2010 ranks

See also
 Ranks of the Colombian National Police

Notes

References

External links 
 Colombian Army Ranks and distinctives - Official site
 Colombian Navy - Official site 
 Colombian Air Force - Official site 
 

Military ranks of Colombia
Colombia